Olivia Ong (born ) is a Singaporean singer and actress. The majority of her works are in Mandarin Chinese, but she has also recorded songs in English, Cantonese and Japanese. In her early days, her entertainment career focused on singing jazz covers, but she has since moved on to Mandarin pop.

Early life
After completion of her O-level examinations at Damai Secondary School in Singapore, Ong moved to Japan to further her studies as well as her career as a solo artist. Ong, by then likened to Seiko Matsuda, had won a singing contest and was signed to Japanese recording company S2S Pte Ltd at the age of 15. Her music influences include Nat King Cole and Nina Simone.

Entertainment career (2005-present)

Ong formed the J-pop group Mirai in Singapore at the age of 15 and with two other Singaporean girls. Their first single, "Open Up Your Mind", was one of the theme songs in the Japanese anime Gensoumaden Saiyuki.

Her début A Girl Meets Bossa Nova was released when she was 19.  Tracks include a reinterpretation Frank Sinatra's hits such as "Quiet Nights of Quiet Stars", among other jazz and pop numbers.

On 17 November 2004, Olivia sang Majulah Singapura at the 2006 FIFA World Cup Asian qualifying rounds (Japan vs Singapore) at Saitama Stadium 2002 before the kick-off.

In 2009, Ong was signed to Taiwanese record company HIM Music and became a big hit back in Singapore after she sang the theme song of the Peranakan-themed drama serial, The Little Nyonya. Her first record under HIM Music was released on 5 March 2010, entitled Olivia. In 2011, Ong recorded a duet, "最後一眼" (Just One Look), with label mate Aaron Yan of Fahrenheit, which was released in his debut EP The Next Me.

In 2011, Ong also appeared in the film It's a Great, Great World (大世界) as Ah Min, a young fashion photographer who stumbled across a set of old photographs taken by her late grandmother (Yvonne Lim). She took the photographs to her grandmother's old friend, Ah Meng (Chew Chor Meng) who might have had connections to the people in the photographs. Ah Meng then proceeds to tell 4 different stories based on each photograph, each telling a story from different generations.

In 2012, Ong has been appointed Music Ambassador of the Global Chinese Music Awards, the second Singaporean artiste to be appointed the role after Joi Chua. In the same year, she also sang the 2012 National Day Parade theme song, "Love at First Light".

Ong appeared on the Mediacorp drama Crescendo in 2015 where she was cast as a singer Alixia. She may also be releasing a new album.

Discography

Studio albums

Compilations and live albums

As lead singer

Awards

Star Awards

References

External links
Olivia's personal website
Olivia王俪婷Ong personal Weibo Microblog

1985 births
Living people
Japanese-language singers
21st-century Singaporean women singers
Singaporean film actresses
Singaporean Mandopop singers
Peranakan people in Singapore
Singaporean television actresses
21st-century Singaporean actresses
Cover artists